Jennis Oprasert (born on 4 July 2000) is a former member of the Thai idol group, BNK48, an international sister group of the Japanese idol girl group AKB48. She is one of the first generation members of the group. Jennis also served as the vice-captain of Team BIII, with Punsikorn Tiyakorn (Pun) as the captain.

Career

As member of BNK48 
In 2016, when BNK48 held the event BNK48 We Need You, Jennis attended the said event. and later on joined the audition for the group. She passed the audition to become one of the first generation of BNK48. A year later, she was chosen to be the centre of the Thai version of the song "365 nichi no kamihikouki", a track in BNK48's first single "Aitakatta". After joining BNK48, she was nicknamed by her fans as "ลูกพี่" (IPA luːkpʰîː, meaning 'gang leader' in Thai), probably due to her (then) big biceps, no-nonsense attitude and rather direct style of communication.  

When the formation of Team BIII was announced at the concert "BNK48 We Wish You! A Merry Christmas", on 24 December 2017, it was also announced that Jennis would be the vice-captain of the team, with Punsikorn Tiyakorn (Pun), as the captain.  
In June 2018, Jennis decided to participate in the AKB48 53rd Single World Senbatsu General Election. This was the first time international groups were included in an AKB48 Senbatsu Sousenkyo, in order to celebrate the 10th anniversary of the event.

Jennis also took part in BNK48's First General Election. The final result was announced on 26 January 2019, in which she ranked as no. 2, with the total voting points of 58,362. The outcome was regarded as a surprise for many people, for in the first preliminary result, her rank was 6 and it remained so in the second round. In her election speech, Jennis thanked her supporters, saying "her miracle was actually her supporters".

As a result of the election, she was one of the three front-row members in BNK48's 6th single "Beginner". A day later, she, along with other BNK48 members, joined the concert AKB48 Group Asia Festival 2019 in Bangkok. She was part of a special unit, the so-called World Senbatsu (WRD48) unit, and performed in the song "End Roll", along with Mao WeiJia (AKB48 Team SH), Shani Indira Natio (JKT48) and Abelaine Trinidad (MNL48).

In the BNK48's 9th single "Heavy Rotation", Jennis remained part of the 'Kami 7' as she ranked no. 7.

In July 2020, Lyra, a new BNK48 unit, was announced, in which Jennis was a member, along with some other members of BNK48, i.e. Pun, Noey, Fond, New and Niky. The band is the collaboration between BNK48 and Universal Music and will focus on T-Pop genre. Initially it was planned that the unit was to be trained in Los Angeles for 30 days but was postponed until further notice, due to the COVID-19 pandemic.

On October 8, 2022, Jennis announced her graduation from BNK48. Her graduation stage was held on December 9, 2022 with her final performance at the BNK48 Theater was held on December 21, 2022.

As actress
In 2008, at the age of 8, Jennis played  Phrae, an abused child, in a Thai suspense/thriller film, The 8th Day. She was nominated for Best Supporting Actress at the 18th Suphannahong National Film Awards from the said role.

In 2018, she passed the audition for a Thai TV Series Be My Boy and performed in the series in the leading role as Pony.

In 2019, she performed in a drama film Where We Belong as Sue, the leading character, together with Praewa Suthamphong (Music). The film is directed by Kongdej Jaturanrasmee and released in Thailand on 20 June 2019. Jennis and Music also sang "Let U Go", a soundtrack song of the said film. Her performance was highly acclaimed by Thai critics. The film's international premiere was at 24th Busan International Film Festival (BIFF)', where Jennis received Marie Claire Asia Award's 'the Rising Star Award.' She was also among 8 Asian actors/actresses who received 'Asian Stars: Up Next'  awards 2019. issued by the International Film Festival & Awards Macao and Variety. She also won 'Best Actress Award' from the 28th Bangkok Critics.

Personal life 
Jennis was born in Phetchaburi on 4 July 2000. Being a Thai-Chinese-Lao descendant, Jennis spent her childhood in Phetchaburi, before moving to Bangkok when she was at Grade 4. Her primary school in Phetchaburi was Arunpradit School (Grade 1-4) and Sangsom School in Bangkok (Grade 4- 6). At Grade 6 (year 2011), Jennis won the National Academic Competition Award (Phet Yot Mongkut) in Thai Language. She studied for Grade 7-11 at Samsen Wittayalai School in a special class for those who were classified as 'gifted in science-mathematics', before moving to Singapore International School of Bangkok - SISB. There, she decided to dub her first name 'Jennis' as her nickname as well, viewing that it would be easier for foreigners to call her as such, rather than her real Thai nickname, 'Kraten' (meaning Kingfisher in Thai).  

Jennis was studying for Bachelor of Science in Applied Chemistry (International Programme) at Chulalongkorn University. Currently, she is studying for Management and Idol and Influencers Development, Faculty of Music at Silpakorn University.

Honours 
Jennis was appointed as a Buddhist ambassador, together with Praewa Suthamphong (Music), for the Māgha Pūjā Day in February 2019 by Thailand's National Office of Buddhism.

On 9 June 2019, Jennis received an Ananda Mahidol Day memorial pin from the One Drop Save Lives Charity Project, together with other 3 members of BNK48 who are students and a graduate of Chulalongkorn University, and the BNK48 executive

Discography 

 BNK48 singles

 BNK48 Album

Filmography

Films

Television

References 

2000 births
Living people
Jennis Oprasert
Jennis Oprasert
Jennis Oprasert
Jennis Oprasert